Igreja de Longos Vales is a church in Portugal. It is classified as a National Monument.

Churches in Viana do Castelo District
National monuments in Viana do Castelo District
Buildings and structures in Monção

pt:Igreja de Longos Vales